The Male Machine is a book by Marc Fasteau written during the second-wave of feminism in the United States. It was published on September 1, 1974, by McGraw-Hill.

The book examined the damaging gender expectations faced by men. Drawing upon personal insights and experiences, the author explores myths about masculinity and their destructive impact on society.

Release
The book was published on September 1, 1974, and had its third printing by December 1974. The book received both a hardcover and paperback release. The book is currently out of print.

Reception
The book was heavily applauded upon release by feminist publications such as Ms. magazine, whose co-founder Gloria Steinem hailed Fasteau as "spy in the ranks of the white male elite" and declared him and the men's liberation movement "the revolution’s other half". But the book received less favorable criticism outside of the feminist circle. Larry McMurtry of The New York Times said, "The analysis [in the book] is sometimes keen and always heartfelt, but a certain fevered urgency blurs the tone."

See also
Men's rights movement
Men's movement
Fathers' rights movement

References

Further reading 

 
 
 

1974 books
Feminist books
Masculist books
Men's rights
English-language books
American non-fiction books
Second-wave feminism
1970s in the United States
Masculinity